Orange B is a food dye from the azo dye group. It is approved by the United States Food and Drug Administration (FDA) for use only in hot dog and sausage casings or surfaces, only up to 150 parts per million of the finished food weight. It is typically prepared as a disodium salt.

Orange B was first listed as an approved food dye by the FDA in 1966. In 1978, the FDA proposed removing it from the list due to concerns about the presence of carcinogenic contaminants (specifically 2-naphthylamine). The only supplier in the United States, the William J. Stange Company, subsequently stopped manufacturing it but it was never removed from the list.

References

Azo dyes
Food colorings
Benzenesulfonates
Naphthalenesulfonates
Ethyl esters
Pyrazolones
Organic sodium salts
Acid dyes